Navy Captain Christopher Osondu was appointed Military Administrator of Cross River State, Nigeria  in August 1998  during the transitional regime of General Abdulsalami Abubakar, handing over power to the elected civilian governor Donald Duke in May 1999.
Shortly after, he was retired by the Federal Government, along with all other former military ministers, governors and administrators.

In November 2001, he was elected Vice Chairman (North) of the People's Democratic Party (PDP) in Abia State.
In December 2002 he left the PDP.
In the 2003 elections he was a senatorial candidate of the National Democratic Party (NDP) in Abia North.

See also
List of Governors of Cross River State

References

Nigerian Navy officers
Living people
Nigerian military governors of Cross River State
Year of birth missing (living people)